E45 cream is a skin care product created in 1952 and currently marketed by Karo Pharma.

It contains the following active ingredients: lanolin, white soft paraffin and liquid paraffin. Although it was initially only available in hospitals, increased demand and successful results made the product available at retail as well.

After belonging to a subsidiary of the Reckitt group until mid-year, the brand was sold on April 1, 2022 and ownership was transferred by Crookes Healthcare to Karo Pharma.

E45 cream

E45 is an emollient. Emollients are proven to seal in the moisture. Paraffin creates a breathable and hypoallergenic layer over damaged skin to protect it from potential irritants whilst lanolin heals and softens the Epidermis. 

The effectiveness of E45 doubles when applied on skin that is still slightly damp.

In 2016 it was one of the biggest selling branded over-the-counter medications sold in Great Britain, with sales of £35.5 million.

The product contains paraffin (a fire accelerant) and can generate fire risks. It has been associated with deaths from fire and, from 2017, was set to carry a flammability warning.

E45 cream contains the following:

References

Ointments
2022 mergers and acquisitions